Hoplodoris flammea is a species of sea slug, a dorid nudibranch, a marine gastropod mollusc in the family Discodorididae''.

Distribution
This species is recorded from Bali, Indonesia.

References

Discodorididae
Gastropods described in 2003